Transmembrane and TPR repeat-containing protein 2 is a protein that in humans is encoded by the TMTC2 gene.

References

Further reading